Louis Leslie Polychone (1914-1973) was an Australian rugby league footballer who played in the 1930s.

Playing career
Graded from the Arncliffe junior club in 1931, Les Polychrone had a long career at St. George although his career was interrupted by a severe injury received in a car accident in 1938. Polychrone spent most of his career in Reserve Grade as either the vice captain or captain, and was highly regarded as a loyal clubman. He was a member of the team that in 1938 won St. George's Reserve Grade premiership. Polychrone retired at the end of the 1939 season.

Polychrone also enlisted and served in the Australian Army during World War II.
He died at Tahmoor, New South Wales on 6 March 1973.

References

St. George Dragons players
1914 births
1973 deaths
Australian military personnel of World War II
Australian rugby league players
Rugby league props
Rugby league second-rows
Rugby league players from Sydney